George Hutton (born 20 August 1942) is a Scottish former first-class cricketer.

Hutton was born at Paisley in August 1942, where he was educated at the John Neilson Institution. A club cricketer for Kelburne, he made two appearances in first-class cricket for Scotland against Cambridge University at Fenner's on Scotland's 1966 tour of England, and Lancashire at Old Trafford on their 1967 tour of England. He took 2 wickets in these matches, but failed to score any runs. In addition to playing at first-class level, he scored in a first-class match between Scotland and Warwickshire in 1967. Outside of cricket, Hutton was a police officer.

References

External links
 

1942 births
Living people
Sportspeople from Paisley, Renfrewshire
Scottish cricketers
Scottish police officers